The High Life is a 1960 French, West German and Italian film directed by Julien Duvivier, based on the novel Das kunstseidene Mädchen (The Artificial Silk Girl) by Irmgard Keun.

Plot
Doris Putzke (Giulietta Masina) is fond of dating men in her quest for finding the perfect one. In her brief relationships, she goes from one disillusionment to another, constantly deluding herself about the intentions of her lovers.

External links
 
 

1960 films
French black-and-white films
Films directed by Julien Duvivier
West German films
Italian drama films
Films set in West Germany
Films based on German novels
Films with screenplays by René Barjavel
German drama films
French drama films
1960s French films
1960s Italian films
1960s German films